Arthur Hodges Hendrix (7 October 1912 – 22 April 1988) was an American amateur tennis player in the 1930s. Hendrix, who was ranked No. 10 in the United States in 1936, He later turned professional in 1940 and was a quarter finalist at the U.S. Pro Tennis Championships.

Career
Hendrix played his first tournament at the Pan American Championships in 1932 where he reached the quarter finals losing to Wilmer Allison. In 1934 was the singles finalist at the  Tri-State-Tournament today's Cincinnati Open. In 1935 he won his first title at the Sugar Bowl tournament in New Orleans against Wilmer Allison. In 1935 he won the Dixie International Championships at Davis Islands, Tampa, Florida against Carroll Turner, and the Florida West Coast tournament in St. Petersburg, Florida.

In 1936, he won the singles and doubles titles at the Tennessee Valley Invitational, and was a semifinalist in both singles and doubles in the Southern championships. In 1938 he won his final amateur title at the Jamaican International Championships against Donald Leahong. 

At the end of 1939 he turned professional and joined the professional tour. In early 1940 he played at the South Eastern Professional. He played his final tournament at the 1940 U.S. Pro Tennis Championship in 1940 where he reached the quarter final stage before losing to Fred Perry.

References

1912 births
1988 deaths
American male tennis players
Sportspeople from Birmingham, Alabama
Sportspeople from Lakeland, Florida
Tennis people from Alabama
Tennis people from Florida
Professional tennis players before the Open Era